The Electoral district of Kilmore, Kyneton and Seymour was one of the original sixteen electoral districts of the old unicameral Victorian Legislative Council of 1851 to 1856. Victoria being a colony in Australia at the time.

The district's area was based on the towns of Kilmore, Kyneton and Seymour.

From 1856 onwards, the Victorian parliament consisted of two houses, the Victorian Legislative Council (upper house, consisting of Provinces) and the Victorian Legislative Assembly (lower house).

Members

One member initially, two from the expansion of the Council in 1853.

Snodgrass went on to represent the Electoral district of Anglesey in the Victorian Legislative Assembly from November 1856.
O'Brien went on to represent the Electoral district of South Bourke in the Victorian Legislative Assembly from November 1856.

See also
Parliaments of the Australian states and territories
List of members of the Victorian Legislative Council

References

Former electoral districts of Victorian Legislative Council
1851 establishments in Australia
1856 disestablishments in Australia